Upper Greenhill railway station served the village of Greenhill, Falkirk, Scotland from 1848 to 1865 on the Edinburgh and Glasgow Railway.

History 
The station opened as Scottish Central Junction in July 1848 by the North British Railway. There were sidings to the north and to the south; only the southern sidings remain today. The station's name was changed to Greenhill Junction in August 1855 and changed again to Upper Greenhill in August 1864. The station closed in September 1865.

References

External links 

Disused railway stations in Falkirk (council area)
Former North British Railway stations
Railway stations in Great Britain opened in 1848
Railway stations in Great Britain closed in 1865
1848 establishments in Scotland
1865 disestablishments in Scotland